In 1628 René Descartes began work on an unfinished treatise regarding the proper method for scientific and philosophical thinking entitled Regulae ad directionem ingenii, or Rules for the Direction of the Mind. The work was eventually published in 1701 after Descartes' lifetime. This treatise outlined the basis for his later work on complex problems of mathematics, geometry, science, and philosophy. The work is estimated to have been written over approximately 10 years, and as such Descartes shifted in his utilization and definition of these rules. Rules for the Direction of the Mind is described as a precursor and 'scrapbook' for his other workings and methods. 

36 rules were planned in total. Rules 1-12 deal with the definition of science, the principal operations of the scientific method (intuition, deduction, and enumeration), and what Descartes terms "simple propositions", which "occur to us spontaneously" and which are objects of certain and evident cognition or intuition. Rules 13–24 deal with what Descartes terms "perfectly understood problems", or problems in which all of the conditions relevant to the solution of the problem are known, and which arise principally in arithmetic and geometry. Rules 25–36 deal with "imperfectly understood problems", or problems in which one or more conditions relevant to the solution of the problem are not known, but must be found. These problems arise for the most part in natural philosophy and metaphysics.  However, the work ends prematurely at rule 21.

Rules

See also
Mathesis universalis
Philosophy of mind

References

External links
 

Works by René Descartes
18th-century Latin books